Kursky District is an administrative and municipal district (raion), one of the twenty-eight in Kursk Oblast, Russia. It is located in the center of the oblast. Its administrative center is the city of Kursk (which is not administratively a part of the district). Population:  56,494 (2002 Census);

Geography

Kursky District is located in the center of Kursk Oblast.  The terrain is hilly plain; the district lies on the Orel-Kursk plateau of the Central Russian Upland.  The main river in the district is the Seym River, which flows east to west through the district, joining the Desna River and eventually the Dnieper River in Ukraine.   The district surrounds the city of Kursk, which is the administrative center of Kursky District, but not part of it.  The district is 430 km southwest of Moscow.  The area measures 40 km (north-south), and 50 km (west-east).

The district is bordered on the north by Zolotukhinsky District, on the east by Shchigrovsky District, on the south by Medvensky District, and on the west by Oktyabrsky District.

Administrative and municipal status
Within the framework of administrative divisions, Kursky District is one of the twenty-eight in the oblast. The city of Kursk serves as its administrative center, despite being incorporated separately as a city of oblast significance—an administrative unit with the status equal to that of the districts.

As a municipal division, the district is incorporated as Kursky Municipal District. The city of oblast significance of Kursk is incorporated separately from the district as Kursk Urban Okrug.

Administrative division of the district
The district is divided into 17 administrative units (selsoviets):

There are 191 rural localities within the district, including 4 unpopulated ones:

References

Notes

Sources

External links
Kursky District on Google Maps
Kursky District on OpenStreetMap



Districts of Kursk Oblast